Malachi, also known as Malachias, is the traditional author of the Book of Malachi, the last book of the Nevi'im (Prophets) section of the Tanakh. According to the 1897 Easton's Bible Dictionary, it is possible that Malachi is not a proper name, as it simply means "messenger".

The editors of the 1906 Jewish Encyclopedia implied that he prophesied after Haggai and Zechariah and speculated that he delivered his prophecies about 420 BC, after the second return of Nehemiah from Persia, or possibly before his return. No allusion is made to him by Ezra, however, and he does not directly mention the restoration of the Second Temple.

Name
Because the name Malachi does not occur elsewhere in the Hebrew Bible, some scholars doubt whether it is intended to be the personal name of the prophet. The form mal'akhi (literally "my malakh") signifies "my messenger"; it occurs in Malachi 3:1 (compare to Malachi 2:7, but this form would hardly be appropriate as a proper name without some additional syllable such as Yah, whence mal'akhiah, i.e. "messenger of Yah". The non-canonical superscriptions prefixed to the book, in both the Septuagint and the Vulgate, warrant the supposition that Malachi's full name ended with the syllable -yah. The Septuagint translates the last clause of Malachi 1:1, "by the hand of his messenger", and the Targum reads, "by the hand of my angel, whose name is called Ezra the scribe".

Works

The Jews of his day ascribed the Book of Malachi to Ezra. Certain traditions ascribe the book to Zerubbabel and Nehemiah; others to Malachi, whom they designate as a Levite and a member of the Great Assembly. Certain modern scholars, however, on the basis of the similarity of the title declare it to be anonymous. G.G. Cameron suggests that the termination of the word "Malachi" is adjectival, and equivalent to the Latin angelicus, signifying "one charged with a message or mission" (a missionary). The term would thus be an official title, and the thought would not be unsuitable to one whose message closed the prophetical canon of the Old Testament.

Date
Opinions vary as to the prophet's exact date, but nearly all scholars agree that Malachi prophesied during the Persian period, and after the reconstruction and dedication of the Second Temple in 516 BC. More specifically, Malachi probably lived and labored during the times of Ezra and Nehemiah. The abuses which Malachi mentions in his writings correspond so exactly with those which Nehemiah found on his second visit to Jerusalem in 432 BC that it seems reasonably certain that he prophesied concurrently with Nehemiah or shortly after.

According to W. Gunther Plaut:

References

 
 
 
 L. Vianès: Malachie. La Bible d'Alexandrie, vol. xxiii/12, Éditions du Cerf, Paris, 2011.

External links

 
 
 Prophet Malachi Orthodox icon and synaxarion

Levites